Gouy-Servins is a commune in the Pas-de-Calais department in the Hauts-de-France region of France.

Geography

Population

Places of interest
 The church of St.Roch, dating from the sixteenth century.
 The war memorial and the CWGC graves.

See also
Communes of the Pas-de-Calais department

References

External links

 The CWGC graves in the communal cemetery
 Website of the Communaupole de Lens-Liévin 

Gouyservins
Artois